Brick Presbyterian Church Complex, now known as Downtown United Presbyterian Church, is a historic Presbyterian church complex located at Rochester in Monroe County, New York. The complex includes the Brick Church and Church School (1860, rebuilt 1903), attached Brick Church Institute building (1909–1910), and Taylor Chapel (1941).  The Brick Church and Church School was designed in 1860 as an Early Romanesque Revival–style edifice by Rochester architect Andrew Jackson Warner (1833–1910). His son, J. Foster Warner (1859–1937), modified the church structure to the Lombard Romanesque form in 1903.

It was listed on the National Register of Historic Places in 1992.

See also
 National Register of Historic Places listings in Rochester, New York

References

External links
Downtown Presbyterian website

Churches in Rochester, New York
Presbyterian churches in New York (state)
19th-century Presbyterian church buildings in the United States
Churches completed in 1860
Churches on the National Register of Historic Places in New York (state)
National Register of Historic Places in Rochester, New York
Romanesque Revival church buildings in New York (state)
Brick buildings and structures